Group C of the 2018 FIBA Women's Basketball World Cup took place from 22 to 25 September 2018. The group consisted of Belgium, Japan, Puerto Rico and Spain.

The top team advanced to the quarterfinals while the second and third placed team played in a qualification round.

Teams

Standings

Matches

Japan vs Spain

Puerto Rico vs Belgium

Belgium vs Japan

Spain vs Puerto Rico

Japan vs Puerto Rico

Belgium vs Spain

References

2018 FIBA Women's Basketball World Cup